Richard ‘Dick’ Brown was a rugby league footballer in the Australian competition – the New South Wales Rugby League (NSWRL).

A , Brown played in 77 matches for the Eastern Suburbs club in the years 1927–29 and 1931–33.  Brown was a member of premiership deciders in 1928 and 1931, losing to local rival South Sydney on both occasions.

References

Sources
 The Encyclopedia Of Rugby League; Alan Whiticker & Glen Hudson
 History Of The NSW Rugby League Finals; Steve Haddan

Australian rugby league players
Year of birth missing
Sydney Roosters players
Possibly living people
Rugby league hookers
Place of birth missing (living people)